Elyakim Haetzni (22 June 1926 – 18 September 2022) was a German-born Israeli lawyer, settlement activist and politician who served as a member of the Knesset for Tehiya from 1990 until 1992.

Biography
Born Georg Bombach in Kiel in 1926, Haetzni immigrated to Mandatory Palestine in 1938 with his parents and sister, settling in the Kerem Avraham neighbourhood of Jerusalem. He studied at the Mizrachi Teachers' Seminary in Jerusalem, and was a member of the Haganah. He was severely wounded in the 1948 Arab-Israeli War and spent eighteen months in hospital. He went on to attend the Hebrew University of Jerusalem, graduating with a law degree in 1954. Whilst a student he established the Sherut HaMitnavdim volunteer organisation, which helped new immigrants and protested government corruption, with Haetzni himself renouncing his membership of the ruling Mapai party.

In 1961 he established a law firm in Tel Aviv. After Israel's victory in the Six-Day War in 1967, he was involved in Jewish settlement in the West Bank, including the re-establishment of the Etzion Bloc and a Jewish community in Hebron. In 1972 he moved from Ramat Gan to the new Kiryat Arba settlement near Hebron. He later opened a law practice in the settlement. He became a member of the Yesha Council's Steering Committee, and joined the right-wing Tehiya party. He was on the party's list for the 1988 Knesset elections, but failed to win a seat. However, he entered the Knesset on 31 January 1990 as a replacement for Eliezer Waldman.

Haetzni was married, with four children. He died on 18 September 2022 at the age of 96.

References

External links

1926 births
2022 deaths
Israeli people of German-Jewish descent
Jewish emigrants from Nazi Germany to Mandatory Palestine
Haganah members
Israeli soldiers
Hebrew University of Jerusalem Faculty of Law alumni
Israeli lawyers
Israeli activists
Israeli settlers
Tehiya politicians
People from Kiryat Arba
Members of the 12th Knesset (1988–1992)